International adoption (also referred to as intercountry adoption or transnational adoption) is a type of adoption in which an individual or couple residing in one country becomes the legal and permanent parent(s) of a child who is a national of another country. In general, prospective adoptive parents must meet the legal adoption requirements of their country of residence and those of the country whose nationality the child holds.

International adoption is not the same thing as transcultural or interracial adoption. However, a family will often become a transcultural or interracial family upon the adoption of a child internationally.

The laws of countries vary in their willingness to allow international adoptions. Some countries have established rules and procedures for international adoptions, while other countries expressly forbid it. Various countries, notably many African nations, have extended residency requirements for adoptive parents that, in effect, rule out most international adoptions.

Process overview
The requirements necessary to begin the process of international adoption can vary depending on the country of the adoptive parent(s). For example, while most countries require prospective adoptive parents to first get approval to adopt, in some the approval can only be given afterwards. Often, an "orphan" is a child whose living birth family has consented to an adoption. Some describe orphanages as "nurseries" or "children's homes" because in numerous instances children's parents have not consented to the adoption of their children. It is not uncommon for a parent to put a child in a "nursery" temporarily while they deal with poverty or work, or want to take advantage of the educational opportunities in the orphanage/nursery. Because orphanages/nurseries often provide education, they function more like subsidized boarding school.

Prospective parents of international adoptees wait to get a referral for a child, which often means waiting until one of these parents of the children in nurseries/orphanages consents to the adoption. Although bureaucracy is often blamed for the slow process of adopting a child, often what is to blame is that the demand for children in the less-developed world exceeds the supply. A senior advisor on child protection with UNICEF, Alexandria Yuster, argues that international adoption is now more about finding children for first world (developed world) parents than finding homes for children. Susan Bissell, also of UNICEF, said that she does not oppose international adoption, but believes that it is preferable for abandoned children to be taken back by their previous families and advises governments to provide small monetary incentives to families who are willing to do so.

In the United States, typically the first stage of the process is selecting a licensed adoption agency or attorney to work with. Each agency or attorney tends to work with a different set of countries, although some only focus on a single country. Pursuant to the rules of the Hague Adoption Convention (an international treaty related to adoption issues) the adoption agency or attorney must be accredited by the U.S. government if the child's country is also a participant in the Hague Convention. If the child's country is not a participant then the rules of the Hague do not apply, and the specific laws of the child's and adoptive parent(s)' countries must be followed. Even when the Hague does not apply, a home study and USCIS (United States Citizen and Immigration Services; formerly INS, Immigration and Naturalization Service) approval are requirements. The Hague is discussed below.

A dossier is prepared that contains a large amount of information about the prospective adoptive parents required by the child's country. Typically this includes financial information, a background check, fingerprints, a home study review by a social worker, report from the adoptive parents' doctor regarding their health, and other supporting information. Again, requirements will vary widely from country to country, and even region to region in large countries such as Russia. Once complete, the dossier is submitted to the appropriate authorities in the child's country for review.

After the dossier is reviewed and the prospective parents are approved to adopt, they are matched to an eligible child (except in some countries such as India, which does not allow "matching" of a child to (a) prospective parent(s)). The parent is usually sent information about the child, such as age, gender, health history, etc. This is generally called a referral. A travel date is typically provided at a later time in most adoptions. However, some countries might also provide a travel date at the time of referral, informing the parents when they may travel to meet the child and sign any additional paperwork required to accept the referral. Some countries, such as Kazakhstan, do not allow referrals until the prospective parent travels to the country on their first trip. This is called a "blind" referral.

Depending on the country, the parents may have to make more than one trip overseas to complete the legal process. Some countries allow a child to be escorted to the adoptive parents' home country and the adoptive parents are not required to travel to the country of their adopted child.

There are usually several requirements after this point, such as paperwork to make the child a legal citizen of the adopting parents' country or re-adopt them. In addition, one or more follow up (or "post placement") visits from a social worker may be required—either by the placing agency used by the adoptive parents or by the laws of the country from which the child was adopted. In the United States, citizenship is automatically granted to all foreign-born children when at least one adoptive parent is a U.S. citizen, in accordance with the Child Citizenship Act of 2000. Depending on the circumstances of the adoption, the grant of citizenship takes place upon the child's admission to the U.S. as an immigrant or the child's adoption in the parent's home jurisdiction.

Policies and requirements
Adoption policies for each country vary widely. Information such as the age of the adoptive parents, financial status, educational level, marital status and history, number of dependent children in the house, sexual orientation, weight, psychological health, and ancestry are used by countries to determine what parents are eligible to adopt from that country.

Information such as the age of the child, fees and expenses, and the amount of travel time required in the child's birth country can also vary widely from one country to another.

Each country sets its own rules, timelines and requirements surrounding adoption, and there are also rules that vary within the United States for each state. Each country, and often each part of the country, sets its own rules about what will be shared and how it will be shared (e.g., a picture of the child, child's health). Reliability and verifiability of the information is variable.

Most countries require that a parent travel to bring the child home; however, some countries allow the child to be escorted to his or her new homeland.

The U.S. Department of State has designated two accrediting entities for organizations providing inter-country adoption services in the United States and work with sending countries that have ratified the Hague Convention on Protection of Children and Co-operation in Respect of Intercountry Adoption. They are the Council on Accreditation and the Colorado Department of Health and Human Services. The U.S. Department of State maintains a list of all accredited international adoption providers.

Major origin and receiving countries of children 

Basic demographic data on origin and receiving countries since the 2000s have only recently been analyzed and summarized in a specialized publication.

Major origin countries of children 

According to one recent study, 6 countries (China, Ethiopia, India, South Korea, Ukraine and Vietnam) were major origin countries for almost a decade in the period 2003–2011. Yet there has been slight change in other countries sending most children.

In 2019, the top sending countries for children adopted by US citizens were China, Ukraine, Colombia, India, South Korea, Bulgaria, Haiti, Nigeria.

Major receiving countries
Based on Selman's research, during the year of 1998 and 2007, the top 10 receiving countries of all 23 reported countries, (ranked from the large to small), are the United States, Spain, France, Italy, Canada, Netherlands, Sweden, Norway, Denmark, and Australia. Among these 10 countries, the top 5 accounts for more than 80% of overall adoption, and the US is responsible for around 50% of all cases. Although historically the United States has been among the leaders in adopting children via international adoption, this has changed dramatically over the last decade. In 2004, 22,884 children were adopted internationally, while only 2,971 were adopted in 2019. This is attributed to a combination of factors: increased bureaucracy due to implementation of the Hague Convention guidelines, legal changes in the countries from which the adoptions occur eliminating countries from which to adopt, increased cost, corruption in some foreign courts/orphanages, and the policy of many countries to only free children with significant special needs.

The US (as the largest receiving country)

In 2019, the top sending countries for children adopted by US citizens were China (819), Ukraine (298), Colombia (244), India (241), South Korea (166), Bulgaria (134), Haiti (130), and Nigeria (116).

These statistics can vary from year to year as each country alters its rules; adoption from Ethiopia used to be common, but international adoption was banned in 2018 by Ethiopia. There were only 11 adoptions from Ethiopia in 2019, compared with 177 in 2018 and a high of 313 in 2017, when Ethiopia was No. 2 on the list. Romania, Belarus, Russia and Cambodia were also important until government crackdowns on adoptions to weed out abuse in the system cut off the flow. Abuses with regard to adoption in some Eastern European countries in the 1990s led to bans on international adoptions in those countries in the 21st century. China has long been a major sending country in international adoption, but recently the numbers have fallen (although it still remains a leader), due to an improved Chinese economy and more restrictive laws. Concerns about abuses with regard to international adoption have been raised for years with regard to China.

Sex ratio of children adopted (US) 

Generally, the US adopts more girls than boys. From 1999 to 2012, around 62% of adoptees by US families were girls, and only 38% were boys. Yet this discrepancy between female and male adoptees has gradually declined. In other words, now the sex ratio of girls and boys adopted is more balanced.

It used to be true that China had more girls available for adoption, due to the Chinese culture's preference for sons in combination with the official planned birth policy implemented in 1979. Until the early 2000s, around 90–95% of Chinese children adopted by American families were girls. For numerous reasons, including a recent amendment of the one child policy, the dwindling number of available females for marriage, and an increased prevalence of sex selective abortions, most orphanages in China now house only children with special needs, the majority of which are male. Because of the heavy preference for females in adopting families most waiting children in China are boys, as girls with the same needs are quickly matched with a long line of families seeking Chinese daughters. Although India also has a noticeable excess of girls available for adoption (around 70%), In contrast, South Korea, another East Asian country, has a relatively large excess of boys being adopted; about 60% are boys.

Countries suspending/ or reducing adoption by US families
There have been several countries (including certain major sending countries) that are completely not or only partially accepting inter-country adoption requests from US families for certain reasons. 
 Russia: In December 2012, Russian President Vladimir Putin signed into law a measure, effective January 1, 2013, banning the adoption of Russian children by US families. The ban was seen as diplomatic retaliation for the passage of the Magnitsky Act in the US, while popular support in Russia focused on incidents of abuse to adoptees by US parents. In January 2013 about 20,000 people marched against the law in Moscow.
 Ethiopia: In February 2018, the Ethiopian Parliament amended the country's adoption laws and removed reference to adoption of its citizens by foreigners. The new law became effective on February 18, 2018.

The US also suspended adoption relationship with selected countries, due to Hague Convention or other rationales. 
 Vietnam, temporarily suspended due to allegations of corruption and baby-selling
 Guatemala, the adoption was shut down in 2007 for adoption after allegations of corruption, families being coerced and children kidnapped to feed U.S. demand. (See also: Adoption in Guatemala)
 Nepal: Although Nepal has not closed its doors for adoption, the United States government has suspended adoptions from Nepal. Documents that were presented documenting the abandonment of these children in Nepal have been found to be unreliable and circumstances of alleged abandonment cannot be verified because of obstacles in the investigation of individual cases.

International legal framework

At the international level, the main legal instrument on intercountry adoption is the Convention on Protection of Children and Co-operation in Respect of Intercountry Adoption (hereafter the Hague Adoption Convention, 1993). However other relevant international legal instruments exist to ensure that the best interest of the child and the concern for her/his welfare inform the practices of intercountry adoption. For example, the United Nations Convention on the Rights of the Child (1989) contains some specific references to intercountry adoption. The Declaration on Social and Legal Principles relating to the Protection and Welfare of Children, with Special Reference to Foster Placement and Adoption Nationally and Internationally (1986) calls Member States to establish policy, legislation and effective supervision for the protection of children involved in intercountry adoption.

All those instruments have some common principles:

 The principle of subsidiarity according to which intercountry adoption should only take place when suitable adoptive parents cannot be identified in the country of origin of the child
 The best interest of the child should be the paramount consideration
 The placement of the child should be made through competent authorities or agencies with the same safeguards and standards as domestic adoptions
 In no case should an adoption result in improper financial gains for those involved.
According to the Convention of the Rights of the Child (art. 21), as well as to the UN Declaration on the Protection and Welfare of Children (art. 17) and the Hague Adoption Convention (Preamble and art. 4), international adoption should be considered as an option if other arrangements (with priority to kin and adoptive families) cannot satisfactorily be arranged for the child in her or his country of origin (principle of subsidiarity between national and international adoption). However the international community still disagrees on the point whether the option of being placed in a permanent family setting through international adoption should prevail on the alternative of the placement of children in domestic care institutions. 
The United Nations Optional Protocol to the Convention on the Rights of the Child on the Sale of Children, Child Prostitution and Child Pornography (2000) is an additional international instrument that calls on States parties to ensure that coercive adoption is criminalized under national law, regardless of whether the offence is committed domestically or transnationally, on an individual or organized basis.

UN Declaration Relating to the Welfare of Children (1986)
The UN Declaration on Social and Legal Principles relating to the Protection and Welfare of Children, with Special Reference to Foster Placement and Adoption Nationally and Internationally was adopted by General Assembly resolution 41/85 of 3 December 1986.
The UN Declaration Relating to the Welfare of Children reaffirms principle 6 of the Declaration of the Rights of the Child, according to which, "The child shall, wherever possible, grow up in the care and under the responsibility of his parents and, in any case, in an atmosphere of affection and of moral and material security."
Article 17 affirms the principle of subsidiarity in these terms: "If a child cannot be placed in a foster or an adoptive family or cannot in any suitable manner be cared for in the country of origin, intercountry adoption may be considered as an alternative means of providing the child with a family." Article 24 requires Member States to consider the child's cultural and religious background and interest. The Declaration encourages States not to hurry the adoptive process. Article 15 states, "Sufficient time and adequate counselling should be given to the child's own parents, the prospective adoptive parents and, as appropriate, the child in order to reach a decision on the child's future."

UN Convention on the Rights of the Child (1989)
The United Nations Convention on the Right of the Child marks a turning point in the international law of children's rights recognizing the child as an active subject of international law whose views must be taken into consideration when dealing with matters affecting her or him (art.12). The principle of the best interests of the child should be a primary consideration in all actions concerning children, whether undertaken by public or private social welfare institutions, courts of law, administrative authorities or legislative bodies (art, 3). This same principle shall be the paramount consideration also when States Parties recognize and/or permit the system of adoption. Particularly, article 21 requires that States Parties "ensure that the adoption of a child is authorized only by competent authorities who determine that the adoption is permissible in view of the child's status concerning parents, relatives and legal guardians and that, if required, the persons concerned have given their informed consent to the adoption. The placement of the child also should not result in improper financial gain for those involved in it (art. 21.d).

The Hague Adoption Convention (1993)
Recognizing some of the difficulties and challenges associated with international adoption, and to protect those involved from the corruption, abuses, and exploitation that sometimes accompanies it, in 1993 the Hague Conference on Private International Law developed the Convention on Protection of Children and Co-operation in Respect of Intercountry Adoption. The Convention came into force in May 1995.

As of December 2018, there were 99 states parties to the convention. Korea, Nepal and the Russian Federation are signatories but have not ratified.

With respect to the previous multilateral instruments, which include some provisions regarding intercountry adoption, the Hague Adoption Convention is the major multilateral instrument regulating international adoption. It calls for coordination and direct cooperation between countries to ensure that appropriate safeguards promote the best interest of the child (Article 1) and prevent the abduction, sale, or trafficking of children.

The convention also requires that all processes should be authorized by central adoption authorities designated by the contracting states. (Chapter III of the Convention outlines the roles and responsibilities of this authority.) If fully implemented at the national level, the convention offers also a protective framework against the risks potentially implied in private adoption (when the adoptive parents set the terms of the adoption directly with the birth parents or with children's institutions placed in the country of origin, without recurring to accredited adoption service providers).

The Convention lets states decide which public agency is the central adoption authority (whose supervision and authorization is necessary to proceed with adoption (article 17 ) and which other bodies should be accredited as the provider of adoption services (Article 9). If fully implemented at the national level, the convention offers also a protective framework against the risks potentially implied in private adoption (when the adoptive parents set the terms of the adoption directly with the birth parents, without recurring to accredited bodies).

The Implementation and Operation of the 1993 Inter country Adoption Convention****: Guide to Good Practice provides a guidance for the Convention operation, use and interpretation. The convention is crucial because it provides formal international and intergovernmental recognition of intercountry adoption, working to ensure that adoptions under the convention are recognized in other party countries.

To comply with international standards, many changes have been introduced in national legislation enacting laws to criminalize the act of obtaining improper gains from intercountry adoptions. However instances of trafficking in and sale of children for the purpose of adoption continue to take place in many parts of the world. Especially during emergency situations, natural disasters or conflicts, has been found that children are adopted without following appropriate legal procedures and risk to be victims of trafficking and sale. 
It has been raised also the issue that an excessive bureaucratization of the adoption process – following the implementation of the Hague Adoption Convention – possibly establishes additional barriers to the placement of children.

Regional and domestic legal orders

Africa

Much interest is shown for cases of international adoption in Africa especially after highly publicized stories of adoption of African children by celebrities like Madonna and Angelina Jolie. Legal frameworks on adoption in general and on international adoption in particular are available across Africa and may vary from one country to another. The following overview of legal provisions put into place by African countries reflects a diverse but not a comprehensive view on how the question of international adoption is dealt with on the African continent. The focus is on countries for which bibliographical resources were immediately accessible.

The Democratic Republic of Congo (DRC) 

On September 25, 2013, the government of the Democratic Republic of Congo enacted a suspension of exit permits for Congolese adoptive children that prevents adoptive children from being allowed to depart the country with their adoptive parents. Although Congolese courts continue to issue new adoption decrees, these are not currently recognized by the Congolese immigration service, the Direction Generale de Migration (DGM), which controls the points of entry. Congolese officials have said the suspension will remain in place until the parliament enacts new legislation reforming the adoption process. Because of the suspension, the U.S. Department of State announced on October 6, 2014, that it strongly recommends against adopting from the DRC at this time.

According to the DRC Family Code, an adopted holds the same rights as a biological child in the adopting family. Links with original family are preserved. This regime is applied to simple adoption.
As far as international adoption is concerned, the DRC Law does not provide a definition specifically; but the judicial practice authorizes the adoption of Congolese children by foreign parents.
Fundamental principles for any child adoption are defined by Law No. 09/001 from 10 January 2009 relating child protection, as follow:
 All children are entitled to adoption
 The adoption of a child by a foreigner can only happen when competent authorities from the origin state:
 Have verified, after having examined the social conditions in the origin state that the adoption is to be done in the best interest of the child.
 Have made sure that:
 The consent for adoption is not given in exchange with payment or any kind of compensation and that this consent was not later retrieved.
 The Child's wishes and opinions have been taken into account in accordance with their age and level of maturity
 The consent expressed by the child for their adoption, when it is required, is freely expressed in ways required by the law, and that this consent is given or recorded in a written form
As for conditions to be met in the host state for a valid international adoption, article 19 of the Child Protection Code explains that the host state should certify that:
 The future parents are qualified and are capable of adopting children
 The adopted child is authorized to enter and reside permanently in the host country
However, even though international adoption is allowed under fulfillment of the above-mentioned conditions, article 20 of the DRC Child Protection Code denies the right to adoption to homosexuals, pedophiles and mentally-ill people.

Ethiopia
In 2018, Ethiopia banned the adoption of children by foreigners.

This followed the conviction of U.S. parents, Carri and Larry Williams, who were found guilty of manslaughter after their thirteen-year old Ethiopian adopted daughter, Hana Williams, died of hypothermia in 2011.  The Ethiopian Government's official news outlet, ENA, claims that the state banned international adoptions due to concerns over child abuse and neglect overseas. There were instances of children who were relinquished by their parents and listed as orphans on adoption registries, which led to the avoidance of undesirable court procedures. Some critics of international adoption cite the reason for unethical adoption processes as being the high demand that countries faced from adoptive parents.

From an Ethiopian standpoint, some citizens felt that international adoption was becoming "the new export industry" of their country at the time of its peak around 2008.

In 2016, Denmark officially ended international adoption with Ethiopia over concerns surrounding the ethics of the adoption process, as well as the health and safety of the children involved.

According to the U.S. State Department, Ethiopia is not a signatory to the 1980 Hague Convention on the Civil Aspects of International Child Abduction (Hague Abduction Convention). The Hague Abduction Convention attempts to negate the harmful side effects that can result in countries participating in international adoption. The convention "focuses on the child," rather than the adoptive parents or biological parents. Additionally, the U.S. and Ethiopia have never had any kind of agreement that would outlaw child abduction, in special relation to international adoption. Prior to Ethiopia ceasing its international adoption process, the U.S. attempted to work with Ethiopia to improve the adoption process.

In 2007, Ethiopia ranked 5th among countries for international adoption by Americans. This was a large increase from their 16th-place ranking in 2000.  International adoptions rose after Angelina Jolie's adoption of her daughter Zahara Marley Jolie that took place in 2005.  The U.S. embassy to Ethiopia reported that adoption numbers in the country had risen so much that extra staff had to be hired to handle to workload. Average waiting time for adoptive parents averaged about five weeks, accompanied by low cost and simple, easy procedures. The high interest found among Americans and Europeans, as well as the cheap and easy adoption process, made the U.S. embassy concerned about adoption fraud. As American laws regarding the practices involved with international adoptions strengthened, adoptions from Ethiopia decreased. Eventually, Ethiopian adoption agencies in the capital of the country, Addis Ababa, began shutting down and going out of business.

Asia
According to recent research, certain Asian countries have been top origins of intercountry adoption, namely China, India, The Republic of Korea (South Korea), Vietnam, etc. Yet Asian countries have different legal framework towards intercountry adoption.

China 

China and Hong Kong Special Administrative Region (SAR) have been party to the Hague Adoption Convention since 1 January 2006. All adoptions in China from another country must meet these requirements as well as Chinese domestic law.

On the international level, China also has bilateral agreements with certain countries, including Australia (The Family Law (Bilateral Agreements – Intercountry Adoption) Regulations 1998) etc.

Domestically, China has two major legislations directly responsible for international adoption affairs.

Adoption Law of the People's Republic of China (Revised), which deals with general adoption issue. Its Article 21 is specifically linked to international adoption. 
Measures for Registration of Adoption of Children by Foreigners in the People's Republic of China, solely addressing international adoption issues.

Other pertinent documents include
Article 26 in Marriage Law of the People's Republic of China, also defines adoption in China in a general manner. 
Measures of China Center of Adoption Affairs for Authorizing Foreign Adoption Organizations to Seek Adoptive Families for Children of Special Needs

Legally, the China Centre for Children's Welfare and Adoptions (CCCWA) (which is different from the China Center of Adoption Affairs (CCAA) is the only agency authorized by the Chinese government to regulate and process all inter-country adoptions from China. And China requires all inter-country adoption be handled through government approval instead of any individual application.

Taiwan
Having been one of the major sources of adoptive children, yet Taiwan is not party to the Hague Convention on Protection of Children and Co-operation in Respect of Intercountry Adoption (Hague Adoption Convention).

Domestically, Taiwan has enforced The Protection of Children and Youths Welfare and Rights Act since May 30, 2012. And according to the Act, all the adoption cases in Taiwan shall consider the national adopter as priority. Besides, all the international adoption cases shall be matched via the legal adoption matching services agency. Except almost the same peer within six degrees of kinship of relatives and five degrees of kinship of relatives by marriage, or one of the couple adopts the other party's children. Taiwan organizations that provide international adoption service work with foreign agency or governmental authority instead of individuals.

The Republic of Korea (South Korea)

The Republic of Korea (South Korea) is not party to Hague Adoption Convention. South Korea's law requires the use of an adoption agency for the overseas adoption of all Korean orphans, and requires that such agencies are authorized by The Ministry for Health, Welfare and Family Affairs.

On May 24, 2013, it signed the Convention on Protection of Children and Co-operation in Respect of Intercountry Adoption (the convention). This is the first step for South Korea in becoming a Convention partner. Adoptions between the United States and South Korea, however, are not yet subject to the requirements of the convention and relevant implementing laws and regulations. According to the Ministry of Health and Welfare, which will be designated as South Korea's Central Authority, there is no set date when South Korea will deliver its instrument of ratification or when the convention will enter into force with respect to South Korea.

Domestically, the Republic of Korea (ROK) Special Adoption Act, which governs intercountry adoptions from South Korea, went into effect on August 5, 2012. This law prioritizes domestic adoptions and endeavors to reduce the number of South Korean children adopted abroad. Under the Special Adoption Act, each intercountry adoption requires the approval of the ROK Family Court.

India
India is party to the Hague Convention on Protection of Children and Co-operation in Respect of Intercountry Adoption (Hague Adoption Convention).

In January 2011, India implemented new procedures to provide more centralized processing of intercountry adoptions. In addition to the new guidelines, prospective adoptive parents should be aware of all Indian laws that apply to intercountry adoption. A child can be legally placed with the prospective adoptive parents under the Hindu Adoption and Maintenance Act of 1956 (HAMA), the Guardians and Wards Act of 1890 (GAWA), or the Juvenile Justice (Care and Protection of Children) Act of 2000 (JJA).

Vietnam
Vietnam is party to the Hague Convention on Protection of Children and Co-operation in Respect of Intercountry Adoption (Hague Adoption Convention).

Domestically, Vietnam Government has promulgated the Law on Adoption and it took effect from January 1, 2011. It contains 53 Articles, and addresses both domestic and intercountry adoption. Article 14 of the Vietnamese law outlines the requirements for adopters, which is also applicable to foreign adoptive parents.

Europe

Since the 1970s, European countries such as Spain, France, Italy, and several Scandinavian countries have experienced a considerable increase in the demand for adopted children from non-European countries as a result of a scarce numbers of national children available for adoptions. Gender studies have also suggested that this is the result of the modern trend in the Global North of delaying conception of the first child, which increases the risk of reduced fertility and the demand for adoption. 
However, recent data show a stabilization or even a decrease in the inter-country adoptions. From one side it has been argued that this is the result of a decrease in the causes of abandonment, implementation of social policies in favour of families, less stigmatization of unmarried mothers, economic development and an increase in the national adoptions in the main source countries. From the other side it has been considered also the result of new regulations and policies adopted by some countries of origin (e.g. Romania) aiming at regulating the outflow of children and preventing child trafficking. The trend however differs from country to country. Between 2000 and 2005, for example Spain, France and Italy have experienced an increase in international adoptions of 70%, while in Switzerland and in Germany they have decreased and in Norway have remained stable.

Council of Europe

The enactment and enforcement of international standards and laws regulating adoption depends on how the competent authorities in each contracting state interpret international instruments and implement their provisions. European regulation and practices on the matter vary from country to country. An attempt to harmonize adoption laws among Member States of the Council of Europe was made with the European Convention on the Adoption of Children (1967), which entered into force in April 1968. In 2008 a revised version of the European Convention on the Adoption of Children was prepared by a Working Party of the Committee of Experts on Family Law under the authority of the European Committee on Legal Cooperation within the framework of the Council of Europe. The convention was opened for signature on 27 November 2008.
As of November 2013, the 1967 Convention has been ratified by 18 of the 46 Member States of the Council of Europe, while 3 Member States are signatories but have not yet ratified. As for the revised Convention, 16 countries have ratified, while another 3 have only signed.
The European Convention establishes common principles that should govern adoption. The Convention establishes procedures affecting adoption and its legal consequences to reduce the difficulties in promoting the welfare of the adopted children caused by the differences in legislation and practices among the European States.
Among its essential provisions, the Convention stipulates that the adoption must be granted by a competent judicial or administrative authority (art. 4), that birth parents must freely consent to the adoption (art.5) and that the adoption must be in the best interest of the child (art.8). Any improper financial advantages arising from the adoption of a child are prohibited (art.15).

European Union

Within the European Union regulation, reference to intercountry adoption is made in article 4 of the Council Directive 2003/86/EC of 22 September 2003 on the right to family reunification. The article regulates the immigration of adoptive third-country-national children provided that the parents are established third country nationals within the European Union. EU Member States authorized the entry and residence of children adopted in accordance with a decision taken by the competent authority of the Member State concerned. Entry can also be authorized by a decision that is automatically enforceable due to international obligations of the Member State or must be recognized in accordance with international obligations (art. 4 (b)).
With the ratification and adoption of the Hague Adoption Convention, European countries have developed training for social workers in charge of providing international adoption-related services. They have appointed competent specialists and created a centralized system of control (e.g. Italy and Germany). In Switzerland, on the other hand, the bureaucratization of the procedures has been considered to have slowed down the process resulting in a decrease of the number of children adopted. 
Traditionally in Spain, France and Switzerland, the adopting parents can choose between two paths to carry out international adoption: referring to the intermediation of an accredited body – most of the time a private organization – and with the supervision of the central adoption authority designated by the state, or opting for a private adoption without the referral to the intermediary. In Italy and Norway the second option, considered as "private adoption", is forbidden. In Italy for example all international adoptions must be arranged by competent bodies accredited by national law. The only exception is granted to prospective adoptive couples where one spouse is a native of the country the child comes from, or for Italian families who have lived for a long time in the country and have a significant relation with its culture. In these two cases their demand for international adoption can be sent to the International Social Service, an international not-for-profit organization active in more than 100 countries through a network of branches, affiliated bureaus, and correspondents, without recurring to the accredited national bodies. 
France and Germany recently adopted a third path, creating public bodies that simultaneously exercise a formal intermediary role and in practice perform the functions of a central adoption authority. Data show that in all European countries, both those that legally prohibit and allow for it, the practice of private adoption is widespread and has raised concerns most of all in relation to the risk of child trafficking.
Many European countries have signed bilateral agreement with countries of origin of the adopted children (e.g. Spain with Philippines and Bolivia, France with Vietnam). Legally speaking, bilateral agreements cannot disregard the guarantees provided by the Convention of the Rights of the Child and by the Hague Adoption Convention.

North America

United States
The United States (US) is bound both by domestic and international laws regarding adoptions of children. The laws cover US families adopting children from abroad, and families abroad adopting US-born children. Many US children are adopted abroad. However, foreign adoptions by American families have dropped in recent years: families in the US adopted 2,971 children from abroad in 2019, compared with a high of 22,884 in 2004.

There are several international treaties and conventions regulating the intercountry adoption of children. When possible, the US prefers to enter into multilateral agreements over bilateral ones, because of the difficulty in getting the Senate to ratify international agreements.
 Inter-American Convention on Conflict of Laws Concerning the Adoption of Minors, 1984 (US not signed or ratified)
US bilateral agreement with Viet Nam on 1 Sept 2005
United Nations General Assembly Declaration on Social and Legal Principles Relating to Adoption and Foster Placement of Children Nationally and Internationally (adopted without vote)
Hague Adoption Convention on the Protection of Children and Co-operation in Respect of Inter-Country Adoption (Hague Adoption Convention). The US has acceded to (signed) but the Senate has not ratified the Hague Convention. The US also made a declaration that this convention does not supersede Title 18, United States Code, Section 3190 relating to documents submitted to the United States Government in support of extradition requests.
United Nations Convention on the Rights of the Child. The US signed (16 Feb 1995) but the Senate has not ratified because of states' rights to execute children (minors tried as adults). This was deemed unconstitutional by Supreme Court in 2005, but the Senate has not reversed its position.

The US Department of State lists the pertinent legal documents regarding adoptions. In particular, the Intercountry Adoption Act of 2000 incorporates the Hague Convention into domestic law.
The act stipulates requirements for US children being adopted internationally. Paragraph 97.3 (§97.3) stipulates the requirements for a US child being adopted internationally in a country that has also ratified the Hague Convention.

A family' eligibility to adopt from another country is fairly similar to the requirements of domestic adoptions, with additions regarding citizenship, visas, and immigration. These are detailed in the booklet Intercountry Adoption from A to Z.

The State Department provides interactive maps detailing US adoption rates since 1999 by several categories.

Reform efforts
Due to the appeal and otherwise obvious difficult issues presented by international adoption, the reform movement seeks to influence governments to adopt regulations that serve the best interest of the child and meet the interests of both the adoptive and biological family members. Significant advances have been made in increasing the regulation of international adoptions.

Adopting families in general have a variety of motivations, such as infertility, being a same-sex couple or single parent, and not wanting to contribute to human overpopulation.  International adoptions can have additional motivations, including reducing the chance that a biological family member will later challenge the adoption or interfere in the child's life, rescuing a child from a life of poverty (seen by some as patronizing or even neo-colonialist), and "saving" a child in the religious sense of converting them to the family's religion (not necessarily considered beneficial by those of different religions or no religion).  In particular, evangelical Christians have been urged to adopt internationally in addition to having large biological families.  International adoption generates additional controversy where the children will be raised in a different culture or religion than they were born into, or by parents of a different ethnicity, especially where this will be visually apparent to others in the society (which may subject the child to stigmatization or discrimination).  Some adoptions compensate for problematic attitudes or practices in the source country, such as abandonment of girls and children with disabilities or serious medical problems, or for economic or aesthetic reasons.

Considering adoption in the crude terms of a market, the global demand to adopt infants is higher than the naturally available supply; most children available for adoption are of school age.  This mismatch encourages international adoption as domestic supply is exhausted, but also creates financial incentives to identify more young children for adoption, especially in developing countries and those with high levels of societal corruption or poor law enforcement.  Certain aspects of international adoption make it easier for agencies and child recruiters to commit fraud, including distance, language barriers, difficulty enforcing laws across international boundaries, and adoption agency contracts disclaiming responsibility for incorrect biographical details.  Abuses which impact adoption decisions that laws, treaties, and reform efforts are trying to stop include representing a child as an orphan when parents are still alive, representing an orphan child as without family when there are extended family members willing to adopt, representing a child as more impoverished than they actually are, falsely representing a child as having no siblings they would be leaving behind, representing to biological parents that a permanent adoption is actually a program to temporarily send their children to a developed country for educational opportunity, and not disclosing that biological parents were (probably illegally) paid to relinquish custody of their children.

After a disaster
Of special note to international adoption are campaigns for adoptions that occur after disasters such as hurricanes, tsunamis, and wars. There is often an outpouring of adoption proposals in such cases from foreigners who want to give homes to children left in need. While adoption may be a way to provide stable, loving families for children in need, it is also suggested that adoption in the immediate aftermath of trauma or upheaval may not be the best option. Moving children too quickly into new adoptive homes among strangers may be a mistake because it may turn out that the parents survived and were unable to find the children or there may be a relative or neighbor who can offer shelter and homes. Providing safety and emotional support may be better in those situations than immediate relocation to a new adoptive family. There is an increased risk, immediately following a disaster, that displaced and/or orphaned children may be more vulnerable to exploitation and child trafficking.

Effects of adoption 
Adoption is a dynamic shift on both the adoptive parent(s) and the child. The adoption process is long and arduous to ensure that the living environment will be suitable for the child. However, it can be very overwhelming; many grow up with a total loss of connection to their biological families, culture and roots. According to Child Welfare Information Gateway, "The home study process can feel intrusive and may highlight issues that you have not fully addressed." The uncertainty of the whole process, including being able to even adopt a child can be overwhelming. However, the adoption of the child has countless beneficial effects on the child. Adopting a child can provide a stable foundation and family situation that is essential for growth and development and can provide new opportunities and resources for an adoptive child.  It can also give the adoptive parents a sense of purpose and completion. However, the Post-Adoption Period can be mentally and emotionally taxing for both parties. Child Welfare Information Gateway also states, "Parents may be unprepared for the issues that may come up throughout the lifelong adoption journey." Unidentified trauma from the adopted child can be hard to pinpoint and treat. Adopted children can also have a fear of rejection and abandonment, which make it hard the parent(s) to connect instantly with the child. This in turn can trigger senses of being let-down, sadness and depression in the parent(s).

In popular culture 
Blue Bayou, a film written and directed by Justin Chon, depicts a Korean-American man who was adopted by a white family and is at risk for deportation because his parents did not file for his citizenship. The movie is based on true stories about interracial adoption, which is related to the Child Citizenship Act of 2000.

See also

Effects of adoption on the birth mother
International adoption of South Korean children
List of international adoption scandals

References

Further reading 
 Rosenberg, Elinor B., The Adoption Life Cycle: the children and their families through the years, New York: Free Press; Toronto: Maxwell Macmillan Canada; New York: Maxwell Macmillan International, 1992. .

External links
Hague Conference - Convention of 29 May 1993 on Protection of Children and Co-operation in respect of Intercountry Adoption
David M. Smolin -  Child Laundering: How the Intercountry Adoption System Legitimizes and Incentivizes the Practices of Buying, Trafficking, Kidnapping, and Stealing Children.